Marieta Gotfryd (born 11 September 1980 in Gorna Oryahovitsa, Bulgaria) is a Polish weightlifter.

At the 2001 World Championships she won the bronze medal in the 58 kg category.

She also won the bronze medal in the same category at the 2005 European Championships.

She competed in the Women's 58 kg at the 2005 World Championships in Doha, Qatar and reached the 5th spot with 212 kg in total.

At the 2008 Summer Olympics she ranked 10th in the 58 kg category.

Now she represents club Tytan Oława.

Notes and references

External links
 Athlete Biography at beijing2008

1980 births
Living people
Polish female weightlifters
Olympic weightlifters of Poland
Weightlifters at the 2008 Summer Olympics
People from Gorna Oryahovitsa
Polish people of Bulgarian descent
European Weightlifting Championships medalists
World Weightlifting Championships medalists
20th-century Polish women
21st-century Polish women